Guy Edward Pearce (born 5 October 1967) is an Australian actor. Born in Ely, Cambridgeshire, and raised in Geelong, he started his career portraying Mike Young in the Australian television series Neighbours. He received international attention for his breakout role in The Adventures of Priscilla, Queen of the Desert (1994) and subsequently took starring roles in Curtis Hanson's L.A. Confidential (1997), Christopher Nolan's Memento (2000) and Simon Wells's The Time Machine (2002). Pearce is known for his performances in the film adaptation of Cormac McCarthy's The Road (2009), Kathryn Bigelow's war drama The Hurt Locker (2009) and Tom Hooper's historical drama The King's Speech (2010). He has appeared in Ridley Scott's Prometheus (2012), the Marvel action film Iron Man 3 (2013), Alien: Covenant (2017), and the historical biopic Mary Queen of Scots (2018).

In Australian cinema, he has appeared in The Proposition (2005), Animal Kingdom (2010), 33 Postcards (2011), The Rover (2014), Holding the Man (2015) and The Wizards of Aus (2016). Since 2012, he has played the title role in the TV adaptations of the Jack Irish stories by Australian crime writer Peter Temple. Pearce starred in Todd Haynes' limited series Mildred Pierce (2011) and the HBO crime miniseries Mare of Easttown. Pearce won a Primetime Emmy Award for Mildred Pierce and has received numerous award nominations including for a Golden Globe Award, three Screen Actors Guild Awards and an Australian Academy Film Award.

IndieWire named him one of the best actors never to have received an Academy Award nomination.

Early life
Pearce was born in Ely, Cambridgeshire, England. His father, Stuart Pearce, was a Royal New Zealand Air Force pilot and RAF test pilot, and his mother, Anne Cocking (née Pickering), was an English schoolteacher. He has an elder sister, Tracy. When Pearce was three years old,  the family relocated to Geelong, Victoria, Australia. When Pearce was eight years old, his father died in a flying accident.

Pearce attended Geelong College, and was a member of the Geelong Society of Dramatic Arts (GSODA) Junior Players. At the age of 16, he was a competitive amateur bodybuilder, leading to the title of Junior Mr. Victoria. He lived in Box Hill North, Victoria in the late 1980s while working on the Australian drama series Neighbours. His first film appearance, while still at Geelong College, was in a Victorian Vice Chancellors-funded film Life and Study at University, produced and directed by Peter Lane of Deakin University. Pearce was 17 years old and played a 21-year-old student.

Career

Film and television 
Pearce transitioned to television when he was cast in the Australian soap opera Neighbours in 1986, playing the role of Mike Young for three years, a role which he reprised in 2022 for the show's final episode. Pearce also found roles in other television series such as Home and Away (1988) and Snowy River: The McGregor Saga (1993).

The director/producer/writer Frank Howson cast Pearce in his first three films, Heaven Tonight, Hunting and Flynn, and paid for him to go to the Cannes Film Festival in 1991 for the premiere of the Howson-directed Hunting. The accompanying Howson-funded publicity campaign brought Pearce to the attention of the international film industry. He made his first major film breakthrough shortly after, with his role as a drag queen in The Adventures of Priscilla, Queen of the Desert in 1994. Since then, he has appeared in several US productions including L.A. Confidential, Ravenous, Rules of Engagement, Memento, The Count of Monte Cristo and The Time Machine.

Pearce portrayed pop artist Andy Warhol in Factory Girl and Harry Houdini in Death Defying Acts. He also appeared in The Road and in Bedtime Stories with Adam Sandler. Pearce continued to perform in Australian films, such as The Hard Word (2002) and The Proposition (2005), written by fellow Australian Nick Cave.

In January 2009, Pearce returned to the stage after a seven-year absence. He performed in the Melbourne Theatre Company's production of Poor Boy, a play with music, co-written by Matt Cameron and Tim Finn.

In 2009, he portrayed Staff Sergeant Matthew Thompson in The Hurt Locker. In 2010, he appeared as David, Prince of Wales, who became King Edward VIII, in The King's Speech. Both films won the Academy Award for Best Picture, making Pearce the first actor to appear in back-to-back Best Picture winners since Michael Peña (who appeared in Million Dollar Baby and Crash).

Pearce starred as the eponymous lead in the Australian TV miniseries Jack Irish, an adaptation of the detective novels of author Peter Temple broadcast on the ABC network in 2012. In May 2012, Pearce was cast to star in David Michôd's The Rover. In 2013, Pearce played the villain character Aldrich Killian in Iron Man 3.

Pearce had a supporting role in Neil Armfield's 2015 romantic-drama film Holding the Man, as Dick Conigrave.

Music 
Next to acting, Guy has a lifelong passion for music and songwriting. He released his first album, Broken Bones, in November 2014. Pearce appeared in a documentary special celebrating Neighbours 30th anniversary titled Neighbours 30th: The Stars Reunite, which aired in Australia and the UK in March 2015. Pearce released his second studio album The Nomad in 2018.
Pearce appeared in Australian band Silverchair's music video for "Across the Night" and in Razorlight's video for "Before I Fall to Pieces." Furthermore, he appeared in the video for the song "Follow Me Around" by Radiohead. He recorded the soundtrack for A Slipping-Down Life, singing and playing guitar on cover versions of songs by Ron Sexsmith, Vic Chesnutt and Robyn Hitchcock.

Personal life
Pearce married his childhood sweetheart, psychologist Kate Mestitz, in March 1997. In October 2015, Pearce confirmed he and Mestitz had ended their marriage after 18 years. Pearce is in a relationship with Dutch actress Carice van Houten; they have a son, Monte, who was born in August 2016.

As an Australian rules football fan who supports the Geelong Football Club in the Australian Football League, Pearce has done media work with the club, including a documentary narration.

Pearce supports a number of charitable organizations for many causes including conservation of endangered animals, the preservation of habitats that assist in the survival of native species, animal rights, animal welfare, and protecting the Earth's ecosystems, along with noting the paramount importance of reducing pollution. He has written of his strong motivation to help as many underprivileged people and societies as he is able to, the importance of finding balance in life, and the significance of fairness, justice and belonging.

Filmography

Film

Television

Music videos

Awards and nominations

On 18 September 2011, Pearce won the Primetime Emmy Award for Outstanding Supporting Actor in a Miniseries or Movie for his work in Todd Haynes' limited series Mildred Pierce as Monty Beragon. Pearce received a Golden Globe Award nomination for his performance. Pearce has been nominated for three Screen Actors Guild Awards winning for Outstanding Cast in a Motion Picture along with the cast of The King's Speech (2010). Pearce was nominated with the cast of L.A. Confidential (1997) and Mildred Pierce (2011).

Discography
 Broken Bones (2014)
 The Nomad (2018)

References

External links

 
 Actor Profile at Local World's Ely News

1967 births
20th-century Australian male actors
21st-century Australian male actors
21st-century Australian singers
Australian bodybuilders
Australian expatriate male actors in the United States
Australian expatriates in the Netherlands
Australian male film actors
Australian male voice actors
Australian male singer-songwriters
Australian male soap opera actors
Australian male stage actors
Australian people of New Zealand descent
English emigrants to Australia
Living people
Male actors from Cambridgeshire
Male actors from Geelong
Outstanding Performance by a Cast in a Motion Picture Screen Actors Guild Award winners
Outstanding Performance by a Supporting Actor in a Miniseries or Movie Primetime Emmy Award winners
People educated at Geelong College
People from Ely, Cambridgeshire
Singers from Cambridgeshire
Musicians from Geelong